The tātua is a traditional Māori belt which main purpose is to carry objects or arms. Several forms of tātuas serve different functions.

Etymology 

"Tātua" is a Māori-language word meaning "belt".

Traditional use 

Māori warriors were famously known for wearing only a maro (kilt) and a tātua during battle. Traditional tātuas are made of harakeke (flax) and used to carry tools or weapons. It sits across the abdomen and can be passed on from generation to generation.

Tātua kotaras are broad plaited belts used as a defence against spears in the period before a mortal combat.

See also 
 Māori traditional textiles
 Matthew McIntyre-Wilson (contemporary weaver of tātuas)

References

External links 
 Maori Costume and Taniko

Māori culture
Weaves
Māori art